Wedemeyer Rocks is a group of rocks that outcrop near the base of the southern slope of Mount Berlin in the Flood Range, Marie Byrd Land. Mapped by United States Geological Survey (USGS) from ground surveys and U.S. Navy air photos, 1959–66. Named by Advisory Committee on Antarctic Names (US-ACAN) for Charles H. Wedemeyer, CM1, U.S. Navy construction mechanic with the 1956 Army-Navy Trail Party that traversed eastward from Little America V to establish Byrd Station.

Rock formations of Marie Byrd Land
Flood Range